Brigitte Vasallo (Barcelona, 1973) is a Spanish writer and antiracist, feminist and LGBTI activist, specially known for her critique of gendered islamophobia, purplewashing and homonationalism, as well as for the defence of polyamory in affective relationships.

Biography 

Daughter of a Galician family that migrated to France and then to Catalonia, she vindicates her xarnego identity, although she does not fit with the original meaning of the term. She has spent most of her adult life in Morocco, which has allowed her to acquire a perspective of the ethnocentric and colonial hegemonic thinking of Western society.

She collaborates regularly with various media, such as eldiario.es, Catalunya Ràdio, Diagonal, La Directa or Pikara Magazine, in addition to giving numerous lectures. Likewise, she is a lecturer in the Master of Gender and Communication at the Autonomous University of Barcelona.

Work 

Vasallo's work is structured around two main axes. On the one hand, she analyzes intersectionality between racism and misogyny, particularly on how it affects Muslim women. In this sense, she denounces purplewashing and pinkwashing, or in other words, how feminism and LGBTI rights are instrumentalized to justify xenophobia, ceasing to be ends in themselves.

On the other hand, she values other ways of relating, apart from the traditional monogamy, overcoming fidelity as a mode of possession and love as a limited good. However, she also warns of how polyamory can be appropriated by neoliberalism from an individualistic perspective, reproducing the inherited power structures and objectifying people and their bodies as another consumable commodity.

Books 

 Pornoburka: desventuras del Raval y otras f(r)icciones contemporáneas (2013).
 Pensamiento monógamo. Terror poliamoroso (2018).
 Mentes insanas. Ungüentos feministas para males cotidianos (2020). 
 Lenguaje inclusivo y exclusión de clase (2021).

References 

Anti-racism activists
Spanish LGBT rights activists
Spanish feminists
21st-century Spanish writers
1973 births
Living people
21st-century Spanish women writers
Writers from Barcelona